Liga Deportiva Universitaria de Quito Femenino, often referred to as L.D.U. Quito Femenino, L.D.U. Femenino or simply Liga Femenino, is an Ecuadorian women's professional football club based in Quito. They are the women's football section of L.D.U. Quito. Since 2019, they currently compete in Superliga Femenina, the highest level of the Ecuadorian women's football league pyramid.

Stadium
Like their male counterpart, L.D.U. Quito Femenino play their home games at the Estadio Rodrigo Paz Delgado, more commonly referred to as Casa Blanca. This sports stadium is located in the Ponceano sector of Quito, on Avenida John F. Kennedy and Avenida Gustavo Lemos. The stadium has a capacity for 41,575 people, making it the second largest in Ecuador.

References

External links
 

L.D.U. Quito
1930 establishments in Ecuador
Association football clubs established in 1930
Women's football clubs in Ecuador
Football clubs in Quito